Mennonite cuisine is food that is unique to and/or commonly associated with Mennonites, a Christian denomination that came out of sixteenth century Protestant Reformation in Switzerland and The Netherlands. Because of persecution, they lived in community and fled to Prussia, Russia, North America, and Latin America. Groups like the Russian Mennonites developed a sense of ethnicity, which included cuisine adapted from the countries where they lived; thus, the term "Mennonite cuisine" does not apply to all, or even most Mennonites today, especially those outside of the traditional ethnic Mennonite groups. Nor is the food necessarily unique to Mennonites, most of the dishes being variations on recipes common to the countries (Poland, Ukraine, Russia, Latin America) where they reside or resided in the past. 

Mennonites do not have any dietary restrictions as exist in some other religious groups. Some conservative Mennonites abstain from alcohol, but other Mennonites do not, with Mennonite distilleries existing as early as the late 16th century.

Types of Russian Mennonite foods 

Russian Mennonite cuisine combines features of various countries due to the history of migrations and most dishes would generally fall under the umbrella of Dutch, Polish, Ukrainian and Russian cuisine. Mennonites in Latin America also adopted local dishes to their cuisine. The result of all these influences is a particular cuisine unique to Russian Mennonites and not synonymous to cuisines of any of their host countries. Common ingredients in Russian Mennonite dishes include cabbage, potatoes, sausage, and a range of dairy products.

Common Dishes
Common dishes for Russian Mennonites include:
 bubbat, a raisin quick bread that is either baked inside a chicken while the chicken is being roasted or baked alone as a side dish
 chicken soup made with star anise
 dill pickles
 disco/discada, a dish cooked in plow disk similar to a wok, used in Latin American Mennonite colonies, particularly Mexico 
 fleisch perishki/perisky/perishky, a meat bun
 formvorscht, a smoked pork sausage, commonly called Mennonite farmer sausage 
 green bean soup
 jreewe, pork cracklings
 kjiekle/kielke, pronounced cheel-chya, noodles
 knackzoat, sunflower seeds
 komst borscht (cabbage soup)
 perishki/perisky/perishky, a fruit hand pie
 plumemoos, a cold plum soup
 rice pudding
 roll kuchen, a sweet fried pastry often eaten with watermelon and syrup
 schmaundt fat, a white cream gravy
 summa borscht (summer borscht) a light cream and potato soup flavoured with formvorscht and dill
 vereniki, a cottage cheese pierogi
 waffles with a sweet white vanilla sauce
 yerba mate, brought by Mennonites from Paraguay to Canada.
zwieback, a two-layered white bun, traditionally roasted and dried, which can be stored for several months and was the main food eaten during Mennonite migrations.

Seasonal Specialties
Dishes typically served once per year are:
 paska, a sweet Easter bread
 porzelke/portzelky or New Year's Cookies, a deep-fried sweet dumpling similar to oliebol

Cheese
Mennonite-style cheese is also famous worldwide. Queso Chihuahua or queso Chester are produced by Mennonites in northern Mexico and Bothwell Cheese is created by Mennonites in Manitoba, Canada.

Faspa
Russian Mennonites also commonly participate in a late afternoon lunch called faspa, which usually consists of zwieback, deli meat, raisin buns, pickles, and cheese (especially cheese curds). This meal is easy to prepare and intended to give farmers a mid-afternoon lunch and Mennonite women a rest on Sunday.

Types of Swiss Mennonite foods 

Because they immigrated to North America much sooner than the Russian Mennonites, there are fewer identifiable dishes associated with the Swiss Mennonites or Pennsylvania Dutch. German beer sausage, schoofly pie, apple fritters, and Amish glazed donuts are a few notable dishes.

Cookbooks
A variety of cookbooks have recorded and preserved Swiss and Russian Mennonite recipes. First published in 1960 by Steinbach, Manitoba's Derksen Printers, The Mennonite Treasury of Recipes (commonly called The Mennonite Treasury) popularized Russian Mennonite cuisine and is the third-best selling Mennonite book of all time, surpassed only recently by the writings of best-selling novelist Miriam Toews. The "Mennonite Girls Can Cook" series also popularized Russian Mennonite dishes, and the More-with-Less Cookbook is found in many Mennonite kitchens. The Mennonite Community Cookbook by Mary Emma Showalter was originally published in 1950 and features Swiss-German Mennonite recipes.

References

 
Cuisine by ethnicity